The Col de Macuègne is a mountain pass located in the Dauphiné Prealps, on the northern slopes of Mont Ventoux between  Montbrun-les-Bains and  Séderon in the Drôme department of France.  The road over the col is used occasionally by the Tour de France cycle race with the tour crossing the pass on Stage 16 of the 2013 Tour.

Details of the climb

From the pass, a minor road crosses the Col de l'Homme Mort en route to Sault.

Tour de France
The tour has crossed the pass twice before 2013, on Stage 16 of the 1956 Tour and on Stage 14 of the 1970 Tour; on both occasions, it was not classified for the King of the Mountains competition.

On 16 July 2013, the pass was crossed on Stage 16 between Vaison-la-Romaine and Gap. It was ranked as a Second Category climb. The leader over the summit was Johnny Hoogerland.

References

External links
Col de Macuègne (www.cols-cyclisme.com) 
Col de Macuègne (velomontagne) 

Mountain passes of Auvergne-Rhône-Alpes
Landforms of Drôme